The Hole in the Wall Gang Camp, based in Ashford, Connecticut, is a nonprofit 501(c)(3) organization, residential summer camp, and year-round center serving children and their families coping with cancer and other serious illnesses and conditions.

History
The Hole in the Wall Gang Camp was founded by actor Paul Newman in 1988. The camp is named after the gang in Newman's film Butch Cassidy and the Sundance Kid. The camp is a  parcel of land including a  lake.

Services
The camp's programs include year-round outreach to hospitals and clinics, and ongoing services for children, families and caregivers. These programs serve 20,000 children and family members annually. All of the services are provided free of charge.

Each summer, the camp offers seven one-week sessions for children aged seven to fifteen diagnosed with cancer, sickle cell anemia, hemophilia, metabolic and mitochondrial disorders, and other serious illnesses and conditions and one session for their healthy siblings. Weekend programs that run in the fall and spring provide a camp experience for the family unit. Activities at the camp include horseback riding, boating, swimming, fishing, crafts, archery, sports and recreation.

The hospital outreach program serves children in hospitals across the Northeastern United States. The camp's staff members make regular visits to these children, introducing services that are consistent with the spirit and programs offered in the camp's Ashford facility.

The organization also offers regional family outreach programming across the Northeast for the families it serves.

Team Hole in the Wall
Team Hole in the Wall is an athletic fundraising initiative managed by the Hole in the Wall Gang Camp. Amateur athletes join up to raise a specified amount of funds and receive entrance to a marathon, bike ride or other athletic event in support of seriously ill children served by The Hole in the Wall Gang Camp or one of its associated camps around the world. Established in 2005, Team Hole in the Wall offers entrance into more than two dozen marathons and cycling events, including the New York City Marathon, Boston Marathon and AngelRide cycling event in Connecticut. New Canaan resident and Newman's Own Vice President of Marketing Michael "Mike" Havard ran in the ING New York City Marathon prior to 2004, but in that year he decided to use his participation to raise funds for The Hole in the Wall Gang Camp, raising nearly $40,000. The next year, he served as captain of the first Team Hole in the Wall team of 40 runners, raising $150,000. The number of Team Hole in the Wall members and events has risen each year since. In 2010, more than 1,800 Team Hole in the Wall members are expected to participate in 20 athletic events.

Funding
The camp relies upon contributions from individuals, corporations, foundations, and organizations, receiving support from more than 25,000 annual donors and many organizations, including Newman's Own, AngelRide Charitable Trust, Travelers Championship, the International Longshoreman's Association Children's Fund, and Newman's college fraternity, Phi Kappa Tau.

The camp also provides advice and financial support to other camps with similar missions, as part of the SeriousFun Children's Network, a worldwide association of camps for seriously ill children.

See also
The Painted Turtle

References

External links
Official website

1988 establishments in Connecticut
Charities based in Connecticut
Ashford, Connecticut
Buildings and structures in Windham County, Connecticut
Summer camps for children with special needs
Summer camps in Connecticut